Nathalie Doummar is a Canadian actress and playwright. She is most noted for her performance in the 2016 film Boundaries (Pays), for which she received a Canadian Screen Award nomination for Best Actress at the 5th Canadian Screen Awards.

She has also appeared in the films Dans l'ombre des Shafia and No Trace (Nulle trace), the television series Au secours de Béatrice and Boomerang and the web series Teodore pas de H.

She is a graduate of the Conservatoire d'art dramatique de Montréal. Her first theatrical play, Coco, premiered in 2016. In 2019, her play Delphine de Ville St-Laurent was adapted by Chloé Robichaud as the short film Delphine.

References

External links

21st-century Canadian screenwriters
21st-century Canadian dramatists and playwrights
Canadian women dramatists and playwrights
Canadian women screenwriters
Canadian dramatists and playwrights in French
Canadian screenwriters in French
Canadian film actresses
Canadian television actresses
Canadian stage actresses
Actresses from Montreal
Writers from Montreal
Canadian people of Egyptian descent
Living people
21st-century Canadian women writers
Year of birth missing (living people)